Robert "Tassie" Johnson (2 December 1937 – 29 October 2015) was an Australian rules footballer who played with Melbourne in the Victorian Football League (VFL) during the 1960s. He was known by his nickname Tassie as there were two other Johnsons at the club at the time he was recruited from North Launceston in Tasmania.

Johnson was a premiership player with Melbourne in 1959, 1960 and 1964. He captained the club during the 1969 season, but they finished in last place.

In 1971 he was captain-coach of Box Hill in the Victorian Football Association (VFA).

In 2004 he was named at full-back in both Melbourne and Tasmania's Team of the Century. In 2015, he died after a long illness.

Statistics

|- style="background:#EAEAEA"
| scope="row" text-align:center | 1959
| 
| 8 || 20 || 0 ||  ||  ||  ||  ||  ||  ||  || 0.0 ||  ||  ||  ||  ||  ||  ||  || 1
|-
| scope="row" text-align:center | 1960
| 
| 8 || 19 || 0 ||  ||  ||  ||  ||  ||  ||  || 0.0 ||  ||  ||  ||  ||  ||  ||  || 0
|- style="background:#EAEAEA"
| scope="row" text-align:center | 1961
| 
| 8 || 20 || 0 ||  ||  ||  ||  ||  ||  ||  || 0.0 ||  ||  ||  ||  ||  ||  ||  || 6
|-
| scope="row" text-align:center | 1962
| 
| 8 || 18 || 6 ||  ||  ||  ||  ||  ||  ||  || 0.3 ||  ||  ||  ||  ||  ||  ||  || 3
|- style="background:#EAEAEA"
| scope="row" text-align:center | 1963
| 
| 8 || 19 || 5 ||  ||  ||  ||  ||  ||  ||  || 0.3 ||  ||  ||  ||  ||  ||  ||  || 7
|-
| scope="row" text-align:center | 1964
| 
| 8 || 19 || 2 ||  ||  ||  ||  ||  ||  ||  || 0.1 ||  ||  ||  ||  ||  ||  ||  || 3
|- style="background:#EAEAEA"
| scope="row" text-align:center | 1965
| 
| 8 || 17 || 1 || 0 || 156 || 22 || 178 || 49 ||  ||  || 0.1 || 0.0 || 9.2 || 1.3 || 10.5 || 2.9 ||  ||  || 1
|-
| scope="row" text-align:center | 1966
| 
| 8 || 18 || 2 || 1 || 239 || 55 || 294 || 59 ||  || 198 || 0.1 || 0.1 || 13.3 || 3.1 || 16.3 || 3.3 ||  || 11.6 || 2
|- style="background:#EAEAEA"
| scope="row" text-align:center | 1967
| 
| 8 || 17 || 1 || 2 || 136 || 25 || 161 || 52 ||  || 11 || 0.1 || 0.1 || 8.0 || 1.5 || 9.5 || 3.1 ||  || 0.6 || 5
|-
| scope="row" text-align:center | 1968
| 
| 8 || 19 || 1 || 1 || 180 || 22 || 202 || 62 ||  || 1 || 0.1 || 0.1 || 9.5 || 1.2 || 10.6 || 3.3 ||  || 0.1 || 8
|- style="background:#EAEAEA"
| scope="row" text-align:center | 1969
| 
| 8 || 16 || 2 || 1 || 183 || 43 || 226 || 39 ||  || 61 || 0.1 || 0.1 || 11.4 || 2.7 || 14.1 || 2.4 ||  || 3.8 || 6
|- class="sortbottom"
! colspan=3 | Career
! 202
! 20
! 5
! 894
! 167
! 1,061
! 261
! 
! 271
! 0.1
! 0.1
! 10.3
! 1.9
! 12.2
! 3.0
! 
! 4.0
! 42
|}

References

External links

Demonwiki profile

1937 births
2015 deaths
Australian rules footballers from Tasmania
Melbourne Football Club players
Box Hill Football Club players
Box Hill Football Club coaches
North Launceston Football Club players
Melbourne Football Club captains
Tasmanian Football Hall of Fame inductees
Melbourne Football Club Premiership players
Three-time VFL/AFL Premiership players